Spitak Pass is a pass in Armenia crossing the Pambak mountains from Aragatsotn Province to Lori Province at height 2,378m. The M3 highway (Armenia) (:de:M3 (Armenien)) runs via the pass.

References

Mountains of Armenia